Kyne or kine is an archaic English word meaning "cows."

As with many Irish and British surnames which were based on the career of the holder, some cowherds (the bovine equivalent of shepherds) came to have the surname Kyne.

However, the Gaelic root of the name is O Cadhain, from the word cadhain, meaning wild goose. The "Wild Geese" were members of the Irish army led by Patrick Sarsfield, who, by the terms of the treaty of Limerick in 1691, were given the choice of death or exile with the Stuart King James II in France.

Bishop John Anthony Christopher Kyne (known as Jack) served as Roman Catholic Bishop of Meath in Ireland, from 1947 to 1966.

References 

Cattle

 Inventory of Edward Hammond of Nonington, Kent 1616 (KHLC;PRC28/9 ff 238-9 ) Item 12 kyne & a bull, ewes and other yonge shepe 24.....